Pocesje is a village in the municipality of Raška, Serbia. According to the 2002 census, the village has a population of 54 people.

Notable people 

 Ljubinko Đurković (born 1962), Serbian colonel and politician

References

Populated places in Raška District